Gordon McLennan or MacLennan may refer to:
Gordon McLennan (politician) (1924–2011), Scottish leader of the Communist Part of Great Britain
Gordon McLennan (rugby league) (1915–1966), Australian rugby league footballer